Amway Center is an indoor arena located in Downtown Orlando, Florida. The arena is home to the Orlando Magic of the NBA, the Orlando Solar Bears of the ECHL, and the Orlando Predators of the National Arena League.

Amway Center hosted the 2012 NBA All-Star Game and the 2015 ECHL All-Star Game. It also hosted some games of the round of 64 and round of 32 of the NCAA Division I Men's Basketball Tournament in 2014 and 2017. On January 14, 2013, the Arena Football League's Board of Directors voted to award ArenaBowl XXVI to Orlando in the summer of 2013.

The arena has also hosted several local graduations, as well as professional wrestling events by the professional wrestling promotion WWE, notably the 2016 Royal Rumble pay-per-view. Due to the COVID-19 pandemic, the promotion took a long-term residency at the Amway Center from August 21–December 7, 2020. During this residency, WWE aired its shows from a behind closed doors set called the WWE ThunderDome. The promotion relocated to Tropicana Field in St. Petersburg, Florida due to the start of the 2020–21 ECHL and NBA seasons.

The road to approval
Prior to Downtown Master Plan 3, the Orlando Magic's ownership, led by billionaire Amway founder Richard DeVos and son-in-law Bob Vander Weide, had been pressing the City of Orlando for a new arena for nearly ten years. Amway Arena was built in 1989, prior to the recent era of technologically advanced entertainment arenas. With the rush to build new venues in the NBA (and sports in general), it quickly became one of the oldest arenas in the league.

On September 29, 2006, after years of on-and-off negotiations, Orlando Mayor Buddy Dyer, Orange County Mayor Richard Crotty, and the Orlando Magic announced an agreement on a new arena in downtown Orlando, located at the southwest corner of Church Street and Hughey Avenue. The arena itself cost around $380 million, with an additional $100 million for land and infrastructure, for a total cost of $480 million (as of March 8, 2011 the arena was expected to be within $10 million of the estimated cost). It is part of a $1.05-billion plan to redo the Orlando Centroplex with a new arena, a new $375-million performing arts center, and a $175-million expansion of the Citrus Bowl. When it was announced in the media on September 29, it was referred to as the "Triple Crown for Downtown".

As part of Amway's naming rights to the old Amway Arena, the company received right of first refusal for naming rights to the new venue, and exercised those rights, announcing a $40-million naming deal to name the venue the Amway Center on August 3, 2009.

Financing
 
The details of the agreement were finalized on December 22, 2006. In the agreement, the City of Orlando will take ownership of the new arena, while the Magic will control the planning and construction of the facility so long as contracting procedures are done in the same public manner as governments advertise contracts.  In addition, the city will be paid a part of naming rights and corporate suite sales, a share estimated to be worth $1.75 million the first year of the arena's opening.  The Magic will receive all proceeds from ticket sales for Magic games, while the city will receive all proceeds from ticket sales to all other events. The Orlando Magic will contribute at least $50 million in cash up-front, pick up any cost overruns, and pay rent of $1 million per year for 30 years. The City of Orlando will pay for the land and infrastructure. The remaining money will come from bonds which will be paid off by part of the Orange County Tourist Development Tax, collected as a surcharge on hotel stays, which was raised to 6% in 2006. The Magic will guarantee $100 million of these bonds.

The Orlando City Council approved several operating agreements connected with the arena plans on May 22, 2007. The City Council approved the plan officially, 6–1, on July 23.  The Venue plan received final approval by the Orange County Board of County Commissioners, 5–2, in late evening of July 26 after a long day of public hearings.  Amendments were made by the County Commission which were approved on August 6 by the City Council, 6–1, sealing the deal once and for all. On December 1, 2007, the City and the Magic came to an agreement on nearly $8.5 million in compensation to three owners of the land where the arena is planned to be built.  An eminent domain hearing confirmed the agreement and finalized the sale.

Design
 
Populous (formerly HOK Sport) was named the Architect of Record on August 3, 2007, with Smith Seckman Reid and Walter P Moore Engineers and Consultants as planning partners.

California-based art curator Sports and the Arts assembled the Amway Center Art Collection. The collection includes more than 340 works of art, including about 200 museum-quality photographs. Fourteen of the 21 artists housed in the collection represent Central Florida. The Amway Center Art Collection includes over 140 pieces of fine art paintings and mixed media originals, over 200 photographs, and graphic wall treatments highlighting both the Orlando Magic and the spirit of Orlando and Central Florida.

Responsive to a challenging 876,000 SF program, the design intention of the Amway Events Center was to mediate its disparate context of elevated highways, central business district and low-rise housing. The simple, planar form of precast, aluminum and glass presents a timeless civic quality. The solidity of the precast and aluminum skin is punctured in carefully considered locations with expansive areas of glass including a crystalline entry lobby facing historic Church Street, blurring the boundary of inside and outside.

The elevated I-4 freeway bordering the east side of the site posed a distinct challenge, threatening to disconnect the arena both physically and psychologically from the downtown core. In response, the corner of the arena is anchored by a diaphanous feature tower bathed in color changing LED lighting that reveals the color and pageantry of sporting and entertainment activities within while marking the facility within the flat topography of downtown Orlando. This tower is both architectural and occupied – housing the Orlando Magic Team Store, hospitality space, Big Storm Brewing Company – an onsite brewery connected to the atrium,  and the "Sky Lounge" or " One 80" rooftop Sky Bar. The latter two are exterior spaces that take full advantage of the warm Orlando climate, commanding views to the plaza below and the greater community beyond. Further city connection is achieved via a 40’ × 60’ LED video feature that addresses downtown from an elevated façade position above the highway.

Amway Center is one of the most technologically advanced venues in the world. Inside the building, a unique centerhung installation, manufactured by Daktronics of Brookings, South Dakota, is the tallest in any NBA venue. It maximizes creative programming options by using high resolution, 6mm-pixel technology on each of the 18 displays, including two digital ring displays and four tapered corners. These displays have the ability to display exciting motion graphics and real time content, such as in-game statistics, out-of-town scores, and closed captioning information. This display will reach millions of motorists traveling by the Amway Center on Interstate 4.

Comparison to Amway Arena
Amway Center has an assortment of mid-level luxury seats and club seating, located below the upper bowl. This contrasts Amway Arena's design as its luxury boxes are above all seats and suspended from the ceiling. The arena's design was unveiled at Amway Arena on December 10, 2007, with an official press release the next day. The floor of Amway Center is designed with arena football in mind, as it features more retractable sections that will permit squared end zone corners, a feature previously not possible for Orlando Predators games.

Construction of Amway Center

Complete Construction Project

Grand opening
 
 
The official ribbon cutting ceremony and dedication took place on September 29, 2010, at 10:01 AM. The general public was invited to enter the building where Orlando Mayor Buddy Dyer gave his annual State of Downtown address. The first ticketed event was a Vicente Fernández concert on October 8. The Orlando Magic hosted their first preseason game at Amway Center on October 10 against the New Orleans Hornets when they won by a historic margin of 54 points, while the 2010–11 regular season home opener took place on October 28 against the Washington Wizards.

Concerts and notable events

Shakira – The Sun Comes Out World Tour, 28 September 2010
Vicente Fernández – October 8, 2010, with Edith Márquez
The Eagles – October 26, 2010 and November 23, 2013, with JD & The Straight Shot
Chayanne – November 20, 2010
The Johann Strauss Orchestra – December 11, 2010, with Béla Mavrák and March 7, 2013
The Trans-Siberian Orchestra – December 12, 2010 (2 shows), December 11, 2011 (2 shows), December 16, 2012 (2 shows), November 30, 2013 (2 shows) and December 14, 2014 (2 shows)
The Gaither Homecoming – December 18, 2010
Barry Manilow – January 20, 2011 and January 18, 2014
Celtic Woman – February 5, 2011
Brad Paisley & The Drama Kings – February 24, 2011, with Darius Rucker and Jerrod Niemann and January 25, 2014, with Chris Young and Danielle Bradbery
Lil Wayne – April 6, 2011, with Rick Ross, Nicki Minaj, Travis Barker and Mix Master Mike
Ricky Martin – April 8, 2011
Lady Gaga – April 15, 2011, with Semi Precious Weapons and May 9, 2019
Usher – April 28, 2011, with Akon, Dev and The Cataracs and December 12, 2014, with August Alsina and DJ Cassidy
Tim McGraw – May 1, 2011, with Luke Bryan and The Band Perry
Bon Jovi – May 15, 2011
Taylor Swift – June 11, 2011, with NEEDTOBREATHE and Frankie Ballard and April 11–12, 2013, with Ed Sheeran and Brett Eldredge
WMMO 98.9's Concert Series – June 12 and October 8, 2011
Rubén Blades – June 17, 2011, with Gilberto Santa Rosa
Maná – July 9, 2011
Sade – July 17, 2011, with John Legend
Britney Spears – July 20, 2011, with Nicki Minaj, Nervo and Jessie & The Toy Boys
NKOTBSB – July 22, 2011, with Matthew Morrison and Midnight Red
American Idol Live! – July 24, 2011, August 2, 2012, and August 1, 2013
Marc Anthony – September 18, 2011, August 5, 2012, with Chayanne and Marco Antonio Solís, August 25, 2013, and October 5, 2014
Marco Antonio Solís – September 25, 2011, with Ana Gabriel
Sugarland – October 20, 2011, with Sara Bareilles
Enrique Iglesias – October 21, 2011, with Pitbull and Prince Royce and October 28, 2014, with Pitbull and J Balvin
Guns N' Roses – October 28, 2011, with Buckcherry
Josh Groban – October 29, 2011 and November 9, 2013, with Judith Hill
Jason Aldean – January 22, 2012, with Luke Bryan and Lauren Alaina
Jimmy Buffett & The Coral Reefer Band – February 4, 2012
George Strait & The Ace in the Hole Band – February 11, 2012, with Martina McBride
Andrea Bocelli – February 12, 2012
Michael Jackson: The Immortal – February 28–29, 2012
Romeo Santos – March 2, 2012, March 28, 2013, and May 30, 2014
Elton John – March 10, 2012 and March 7, 2015
The Red Hot Chili Peppers – March 31, 2012, with Santigold
Van Halen – April 14, 2012, with Kool & the Gang
Tom Petty and the Heartbreakers – May 3, 2012, with Regina Spektor
Nickelback – May 4, 2012, with Bush, Seether and My Darkest Days
Roger Waters & The Bleeding Heart Band – June 16, 2012
LMFAO – June 23, 2012, with The Far East Movement, Sidney Samson and Natalia Kills
One Direction – June 30, 2012, with Olly Murs and Manika
The Fresh Music Festival – July 3, 2012
Rod Stewart – August 3, 2012, with Stevie Nicks
Big Time Rush – August 28, 2012, with Cody Simpson and Rachel Crow
The Zac Brown Band – October 27, 2012, with Levi Lowrey
The Who – November 3, 2012, with Vintage Trouble
Carrie Underwood – December 21, 2012, with Hunter Hayes
Justin Bieber – January 25, 2013, with Carly Rae Jepsen and Cody Simpson
Luke Bryan – January 26, 2013, with Thompson Square and Florida Georgia Line and February 19 and 21, 2015, with Randy Houser and Dustin Lynch
P!nk – February 24, 2013, with The Hives
Muse – February 25, 2013, with Dead Sara
Three Days Grace – March 9, 2013, with Shinedown and P.O.D.
Maroon 5 – March 30, 2013, with The Neon Trees and Owl City
Rush – April 28, 2013
Paul McCartney – May 18–19, 2013
New Kids on the Block – June 21, 2013, with Boyz II Men and 98 Degrees
Carlos Vives – July 12, 2013
KISS – August 16, 2013, with LEOGUN
Bruno Mars & The Hooligans – August 27, 2013, with Fitz and the Tantrums
Il Volo – September 22, 2013, with Nikki Yanofsky
Sarah Brightman – October 8, 2013
Avenged Sevenfold – October 16, 2013, with The Deftones and Ghost B.C.
Michael Bublé – October 30, 2013, with Naturally 7
Nine Inch Nails – October 31, 2013, with Gary Numan
John Mayer – December 9, 2013, with Phillip Phillips
The Fresh Beat Band – December 15, 2013
Justin Timberlake – December 19, 2013
Paul Simon – March 16, 2014, with Sting
Miley Cyrus – March 24, 2014, with Icona Pop and Sky Ferreira
Cher – May 16, 2014, with Cyndi Lauper
Blake Shelton – August 30, 2014, with Neal McCoy, The Band Perry and Dan + Shay
The Super Freestyle Explosion Concert – September 12, 2014
Demi Lovato – September 15, 2014, with Christina Perri and MKTO
Varekai – September 17–21, 2014
James Taylor – November 18, 2014
The Black Keys – December 17, 2014, with St. Vincent
Billy Joel New Year's Eve Concert – December 31, 2014, with Rufus Wainwright & Brian Johnson
Linkin Park – January 15, 2015, with Rise Against and Of Mice & Men
Juan Gabriel – February 15, 2015
Fleetwood Mac – March 23, 2015
Ariana Grande – March 26, 2015, with Rixton and Cashmere Cat
Janet Jackson – September 23, 2015 and April 19, 2023, with Ludacris
Selena Gomez – June 10, 2016, with DNCE and Bea Miller
Twenty One Pilots – July 1, 2016, with Mutemath and Chef'Special
Demi Lovato and Nick Jonas – July 2, 2016
Maroon 5 – September 9, 2016, with Tove Lo and R. City
Sia – October 30, 2016 (Nostalgic For The Present Tour)
Panic! at the Disco – April 14, 2017, with MisterWives and Saint Motel
Ariana Grande – April 15, 2017, with Victoria Monét and Little Mix
Red Hot Chili Peppers – April 26, 2017, with Babymetal and Jack Irons
J. Cole – August 15, 2017
Shawn Mendes – July 28, 2017, with Charlie Puth
Ed Sheeran – August 31, 2017, with James Blunt
Mumford & Sons – September 21, 2017, with Hiss Golden Messenger
Bruno Mars – October 14, 2017, with Jorja Smith
Tim McGraw and Faith Hill – October 21, 2017, with LoCash
Halsey – October 22, 2017, with PartyNextDoor and Charli XCX
Imagine Dragons – November 10, 2017, with Grouplove and K.Flay
Jay-Z – November 11, 2017, with Vic Mensa
Enrique Iglesias and Pitbull – November 14, 2017
Katy Perry – December 17, 2017, with Purity Ring
Miranda Lambert – January 19, 2018, with Jon Pardi
Lana Del Rey – February 2, 2018, with Kali Uchis
Dead & Company – February 27, 2018
Romeo Santos – March 13, 2018
Pink – April 24, 2018, with Kidcutup
Sam Smith – July 11, 2018
Shakira – August 14, 2018
Monster Jam – August 18, 2018
Travis Scott – March 15, 2019
President Donald Trump – Hosted a major campaign rally on June 18, 2019, officially announcing his 2020 re-election campaign.
JoJo Siwa – July 10, 2019
Jonas Brothers – August 9 and November 16, 2019
Ariana Grande – November 25, 2019 with Social House
Billie Eilish – March 10, 2020 with Jessie Reyez
Harry Styles – October 7, 2021 with Jenny Lewis
Dua Lipa – February 11, 2022, Future Nostalgia Tour
Tyler, The Creator – March 18, 2022
Bad Bunny – March 29, 2022
For King & Country – December 10, 2022
Trans-Siberian Orchestra – December 17, 2022
TobyMac – February 3, 2023, Hits Deep Tour, with Crowder, Cochren and Co, Tasha Layton, Jon Reddick, Terrian
Bruce Springsteen and the E Street Band - February 5, 2023
RBD - September 23, 2023, Soy Rebelde Tour

Florida musicians who have performed at the Amway Center include Shinedown in 2010, NKOTBSB (with Orlando's Backstreet Boys) in '11, Rick Ross in '11, Jimmy Buffett in '12, the late Tom Petty in '12, Pitbull in '12 at the NBA All-Star Game, Enrique Iglesias in '17, Florida Georgia Line in '17, and Ariana Grande in '15, '17, and '19, Backstreet Boys again in '19, and Luis Fonsi in '21.

Professional wrestling 

On January 24, 2016, WWE hosted its pay-per-view event Royal Rumble at the Amway Center.

From April 1–4, 2017, Amway Center hosted multiple WWE shows as part of the festivities for WrestleMania 33 at Camping World Stadium, including NXT TakeOver: Orlando on the Saturday before the event, and the post-WrestleMania editions of Raw and SmackDown.

From August 21 to December 7, 2020, WWE produced Raw, SmackDown, and their associated pay-per-views at the arena as part of a bio-secure bubble called the WWE ThunderDome. The programs and events had been broadcast from the WWE Performance Center in Orlando since mid-March due to the COVID-19 pandemic in the United States; as with the Performance Center broadcasts, these programs were produced behind closed doors with no in-person spectators, but featured a larger-scale in-arena production in comparison to the Performance Center (promoted as being at a similar caliber to WWE pay-per-views), a virtual audience (similar to the nearby NBA bubble), and other lighting and pyrotechnic effects. Under the arrangement, five pay-per-views were hosted in the arena, including SummerSlam, Payback, Clash of Champions, Hell in a Cell, and Survivor Series. WWE relocated the ThunderDome to Tropicana Field in St. Petersburg on December 11 due to the start of the 2020–21 ECHL and NBA seasons. WWE returned to Amway Center for the first time since the ThunderDome for the August 9, 2021 Raw.

Mixed martial arts 
It hosted UFC on Fox: Werdum vs. Browne on April 19, 2014, UFC on Fox: dos Anjos vs. Cowboy 2 on December 19, 2015, UFC on Fox: Emmett vs. Stephens on February 24, 2018 and UFC on ESPN: Thompson vs. Holland on December 3, 2022.

References

External links

Official site

Amway
Basketball venues in Florida
Indoor arenas in Florida
Indoor ice hockey venues in Florida
Leadership in Energy and Environmental Design basic silver certified buildings
National Basketball Association venues
Mixed martial arts venues in Florida
Orlando Magic venues
Sports venues completed in 2010
Sports venues in Orlando, Florida
Music venues in Orlando, Florida
2010 establishments in Florida
Populous (company) buildings